"I Feel Like a Bullet (In the Gun of Robert Ford)" is a song by English musician Elton John written by John and Bernie Taupin, released in 1976 as a double A-side single with "Grow Some Funk of Your Own" from his tenth studio album Rock of the Westies (1975). The song reached No. 14 on the U.S. Billboard Hot 100 in February 1976 and No. 21 Easy Listening, but failed to chart in the singer's native United Kingdom.

Background
The song's lyrics compare the shooting of Jesse James by James' outlaw-partner Robert Ford to Taupin's failed marriage to his first wife Maxine Feibelman, of "Tiny Dancer" fame.

Since its release, John rarely played the song at his concerts. A live version, recorded in England in May 1977 with just Elton on piano and Ray Cooper on percussion, was released by MCA Records on the To Be Continued... box set released in 1990 (1991 in the UK).

Charts

References 

1976 singles
Elton John songs
Songs about marriage
Songs about Jesse James
Songs with music by Elton John
Songs with lyrics by Bernie Taupin
Song recordings produced by Gus Dudgeon
Pop ballads
MCA Records singles
DJM Records singles
1975 songs